Ho-204 was a Japanese aircraft autocannon that saw limited use during World War II. It was the largest gun to see active service derived from the Model 1921 Aircraft Browning.  It was used as upward-oblique armament in the Ki-46-III and as nose armament in several experimental anti-bomber aircraft, including variants of the Kawasaki Ki-45.

Specifications
Caliber: 37 mm (1.45 in)
Overall length: 2,390  mm (94  in)
Barrel length: 1,260  mm (49.6  in)
Ammunition: 37 x 144 (475 g)
Weight: 130 kg (285 lb)
Rate of fire: 400 rounds/min
Muzzle velocity: 710 m/s (2,330 ft/s)

See also
Ho-5 cannon
MK 108 cannon
Ho-155 cannon
Ho-203 cannon
Ho-301 cannon
Ho-401 cannon

References

37 mm artillery
Aircraft guns
Autocannon
Machine guns of Japan